Route 490 is a north–south provincial highway in the Canadian province of New Brunswick. The road runs from Route 116 intersection in Bass River. The road has a length of approximately 57.6 kilometres, and services small, otherwise isolated rural communities. In these areas, the highway is often unofficially referred to as "Main  Street". When the highway enters Moncton it is known as McLaughlin Drive.

History

Intersecting routes
New Brunswick Route 116 in Bass River
New Brunswick Route 510 in Browns Yard
New Brunswick Route 470 in Pine Ridge
New Brunswick Route 515 in McLean Settlement
New Brunswick Route 485 in Sweeneyville
New Brunswick Route 515 in Hebert
New Brunswick Route 2 in Moncton
New Brunswick Route 115 in Moncton

River crossings
 Richibucto River - Browns Yard
 Richibucto River - Pine Ridge (2 crossings)
 Bouctouche River - McLean Settlement
 Bouctouche River - Gladside

Communities along Route
Bass River
Browns Yard
Pine Ridge
McLean Settlement
Gladeside
Dundas
McQuade
Ammon
Moncton

See also
List of New Brunswick provincial highways

References

490
490
490
490
Transport in Moncton